VK, Vk or vk may refer to:
 VK (company), a Russian internet company
 VK (service), a Russian social network
 VK Mobile, a Korean mobile phone manufacturer
 Akai VK, a portable helical scan EIA video VTR
 Holden VK Commodore, a model of GM Holden's Commodore car, produced from 1984 to 1986
 Vasant Kunj, an upmarket residential colony in South West Delhi, India
 Virat Kohli, an Indian cricketer born 1988
 Virgin Nigeria Airways (IATA airline designator VK, 2004-2012)
 Level Europe (IATA airline designator VK since 2018)
 Visual kei, a movement among Japanese musicians featuring eccentric, sometimes flamboyant looks
 Vodka Kick, an alcoholic beverage sold in the UK
 Voight-Kampff machine, in the science fiction film Blade Runner
 Cirrus VK-30, an American homebuilt aircraft
 de Volkskrant, a Dutch daily newspaper
 Vedanta Kesari, an English-language monthly magazine in India
 Versuchskampffahrzeug, a German abbreviation, meaning research/experimental fighting vehicle. Used in the names of some German tanks
 Vertical Kilometer, a one km uphill running time trial / race